The Hialeah Park Race Track (also known as the Hialeah Race Track or Hialeah Park) is a historic racetrack in Hialeah, Florida. Its site covers 40 square blocks of central-east side Hialeah from Palm Avenue east to East 4th Avenue, and from East 22nd Street on the south to East 32nd Street on the north. On March 5, 1979, it was added to the U.S. National Register of Historic Places. Another listing for it was added in 1988.
The Hialeah Park Race Track is served by the Miami Metrorail at the Hialeah Station at Palm Avenue and East 21st Street.

History
The Hialeah Park Race Track is one of the oldest existing recreational facilities in southern Florida. Originally opened in 1922 by aviation pioneer Glenn Curtiss and his partner, Missouri cattleman James H. Bright, as part of their development of the town of Hialeah, Florida, Hialeah Park opened as a greyhound racing track operated by the Miami Kennel Club. The Miami Jockey Club launched Hialeah's Thoroughbred horse racing track on January 25, 1925. The facility was severely damaged by the 1926 hurricane and in 1930 was sold to Philadelphia horseman Joseph E. Widener. With Kentucky horseman Col. Edward R. Bradley as an investor, Widener hired architect Lester W. Geisler to design a complete new grandstand and Renaissance Revival clubhouse facilities along with landscaped gardens of native flora and fauna and a lake in the infield that Widener stocked with flamingos. Hailed as one of the most beautiful racetracks in the world, Hialeah Park officially opened on January 14, 1932. An Australian totalisator for accepting parimutuel betting was the first to be installed in America. The park became so famous for its flamingo flocks that it has been officially designated a sanctuary for the American Flamingo by the Audubon Society.

In 1987, the horse-racing movie Let It Ride, with Richard Dreyfuss, Teri Garr, and Jennifer Tilly, had most of its principal film photography shot at
Hialeah Park. Hialeah Park also made an appearance in Public Enemies but most scenes were shot in the Midwest. The Champ (1979) with Jon Voight, Faye Dunaway and Ricky Schroder filmed scenes on Flamingo Day, 3/4/78.

Hialeah Park Racetrack was listed on the National Register of Historic Places on March 2, 1979. On January 12, 1988, the property was determined eligible for designation as a National Historic Landmark by the Secretary of the Interior.

In 2001, Hialeah Park stopped hosting racing after a change in state law kept it from having exclusive dates in its competition with Gulfstream Park and Calder Race Course. Consequently, owner John Brunetti closed Hialeah Park to the public. The filly Cheeky Miss won the last thoroughbred race run at Hialeah on May 22, 2001.

Among the races the track hosted was the appropriately named Flamingo Stakes, an important stepping stone to the Kentucky Derby for 3-year-old horses, and the once prestigious Widener Handicap, a major race for horses four years and older that was the East Coast counterpart to the Santa Anita Handicap in California.

Hialeah Park Race Track Thoroughbred flat stakes races

 Bahamas Stakes
 Black Helen Handicap
 Bougainvillea Handicap
 Columbiana Handicap
 Everglades Stakes
 Flamingo Stakes
 Hialeah Juvenile Stakes
 Hialeah Stakes
 Hialeah Turf Cup Handicap
 Hibiscus Stakes
 McLennan Handicap
 Palm Beach Handicap
 Royal Palm Handicap
 Seminole Handicap
 Widener Handicap

In 2004, the Florida Division of Pari-Mutuel Wagering revoked Hialeah's thoroughbred permit because it did not hold races for the previous two years. As of 2013, its facilities remain intact except for the stables, which were demolished in early 2007. In 2006, the abandoned Hialeah Park site was considered to be a possible location for a new Florida Marlins Ballpark.

In March 2009, it was announced that track owner John Brunetti was awarded a racing permit. Design firm EwingCole was selected to develop a master plan for renovation and further development, including a new casino.  A $40–$90 million restoration project was begun in mid-2009.

On May 7, 2009, the Florida legislature agreed to a deal with the Seminole Tribe of Florida that allowed Hialeah Park to operate slot machines and run Quarter Horse races. The historic racetrack reopened on November 28, 2009, but only for quarter horse races. The park installed slot machines in January 2010 as part of a deal to allow for two calendar seasons of racing. The races ran until February 2, 2010. Only a portion of the park has been restored and an additional $30 million will be needed to complete this first phase of the project. The full transformation was expected to cost $1 billion since the plan included a complete redevelopment of the surrounding area including the construction of an entertainment complex to include a hotel, restaurants, casinos, stores and a theater. In June 2010 concerns were raised over the preservation of Hialeah Park's historical status as the planned development threatened to hurt Hialeah Park's potential as a National Historic Landmark.

On August 14, 2013, Brunetti opened a new casino at Hialeah Park and continues to host winter Quarter Horse racing meets (using temporary stables).

See also
List of casinos in Florida

References

External links

B&W Photo collection titled: 57 Old Photos of Hialeah Park in All its Architectural Grandeur
Dade County listings at National Register of Historic Places
Hialeah Park Race Track at Florida's Office of Cultural and Historical Programs
Hialeah Park at National Park Service Cultural Resources
Photos of Hialeah racetrack facilities
Hileah Park's Australian Totalizator (1932)

1922 establishments in Florida
Casinos in Florida
Defunct greyhound racing venues in the United States
Hialeah Park
Historic American Buildings Survey in Florida
Horse racing venues in Florida
National Register of Historic Places in Miami-Dade County, Florida
Sports venues completed in 1922
Sports venues in Miami-Dade County, Florida
Sports venues on the National Register of Historic Places in Florida
Tourist attractions in Miami-Dade County, Florida